The Rock Star and the Mullahs is a 2003 documentary film directed by Ruhi Hamid and Angus MacQueen and by producer Pamela Friedman. The film follows the journey of the South Asian rock music band Junoon and addresses music in Islam. The film won the "Outstanding story on South Asia - Broadcast" award at the South Asian Journalists Association Awards.

On 17 July 2003, the documentary was aired by BBC on the television programme Wide Angle, based upon Junoon and music in Islam.

Synopsis

The film follows with the journey of the biggest South Asian rock music band Junoon and regarding music in Islam. Salman Ahmad, lead guitarist, travel throughout the country in search for the answer of one question for the clerics: "Where in Islam does it say that music is forbidden?". His journey in search of an answer, taking in affectionate fans and fiery preachers.

A public ban on music gradually takes an effect in Pakistan's Khyber Pakhtunkhwa, after a radical alliance of right-wing religious parties gain power in local elections the previous year. Several music and film stores are closed, musicians have been harassed and vigilantes routinely tear down posters and torch tapes, decrying them as "un-Islamic". But in the town of Peshawar, near the Afghan border, an encounter with a bus-load of Pashtuns showed Salman Ahmad how the masses are still in thrall to music. Salman Ahmad is mobbed by men who ask for his autograph and then start singing the tune with which his band hit the big time - "Jazba-e-Junoon". When Ahmad asks them why they think the provincial government has banned music, he is told "They want to listen to music themselves, they just don't want us to have it."

At a religious ceremony in Peshawar, all the young mullahs are aware of Ahmad and his famous band. But they are unable to tell him why music has been banned and are distinctly displeased when he sings a few verses from the Quran to the accompaniment of a guitar. As the film proceeds, Ahmad also meet the maverick preacher, Maulana Bijli, a critic of Western powers, weak Muslim governments and pop music. The Maulana is not convinced by Ahmad's argument that music should no more be banned in Pakistan than in 52 other Muslim countries.

Ahmad then meets Gulzar Alam, a traditional Pashtun musician who has first-hand experience of the authorities' crackdown on song. Ahmad sees the ban on music as part of his battle between Islamic extremists like those who rule the Khyber Pakhtunkhwa Province and "moderate modernists" such as himself.

As Ahmad's meeting with Maulana Bijli draws to a close, the firebrand cleric pats him on the hand and expresses the hope that he hasn't caused offence and that the two men will, one day, meet again. And then, with the instruction to "play this for them in London," Maulana Bijli bursts into song - a song of religious devotion, but melodious nonetheless.

Reception
The Rock Star and the Mullahs aired on 17 July 2003 on BBC in United Kingdom. It went on to screen at various film festivals, winning numerous awards, including:

 "Outstanding story on South Asia - Broadcast" award at the South Asian Journalists Association Awards, 2004.

References

External links
 Wide Angle - The Rock Star and the Mullahs
 Junoon Official site
 

2003 television films
2003 films
Junoon (band)
British documentary films
Pakistani documentary films
2003 documentary films
2000s English-language films
2000s British films